Pozdišovce is a village and municipality in Michalovce District in the Košice Region of eastern Slovakia.

History
In historical records, the village was first mentioned in 1315.
It lies in the Zemplín lowland. The town of Pozdišovce is commonly found on historical documents under the name of Pazdics.  (Pazdics, being the Hungarian form of Pozdišovce.)

Geography
The village lies at an altitude of 123 metres and covers an area of 18.049 km². The municipality has a population of about 1266 people.

Culture
The village has a public library and a football field.

Pozdišovce is famous throughout the country for its unique ceramics manufacturing tradition, with dark glazing and unusual ornaments.

Cultural heritage monuments
 Lutheran church
 Greek Catholic church 3D model
 Pozdišovce manor house

Transport
Pozdišovce lies on the main eastward route from Košice to Michalovce and to the Slovak-Ukrainian border crossing at Vyšné Nemecké.

The village of Pozdišovce has three bus stops and regular bus services to Michalovce, Sečovce, Košice and various neighbouring rural municipalities.

Gallery

External links

http://www.statistics.sk/mosmis/eng/run.html—broken link

Villages and municipalities in Michalovce District